Sir George Stanley Waller  (3 August 19115 February 1999) was a British Lord Justice of Appeal.

He was educated at Oundle School and Queens' College, Cambridge and was called to the bar at Gray's Inn in 1934 becoming a Bencher in 1961 and Treasurer in 1978. He was made a QC in 1954, a recorder from 1953 to 1965, and a judge of the High Court of Justice (Queen's Bench Division) from 1965 to 1976. He was a Lord Justice of Appeal from 1976 to 1984. He played rugby union for Cambridge University R.U.F.C., gaining a blue by playing in The Varsity Match in 1932.

His son is Sir Mark Waller.

References

1911 births
1999 deaths
People educated at Oundle School
Alumni of Queens' College, Cambridge
Members of Gray's Inn
Queen's Bench Division judges
Lords Justices of Appeal
Officers of the Order of the British Empire
Knights Bachelor
Members of the Privy Council of the United Kingdom
Cambridge University R.U.F.C. players